The 1906 North Armagh by-election was held on 16 November 1906.  The by-election was held due to the death of the incumbent Irish Unionist MP, Edward James Saunderson.  It was won by the Irish Unionist candidate William Moore.

References

1906 elections in the United Kingdom
By-elections to the Parliament of the United Kingdom in County Armagh constituencies
20th century in County Armagh
1906 elections in Ireland